Jared Daperis (born 18 August 1991) is an Australian film director. He has received a Young Artist Award nomination and Berlin Commercial Award Nominations.

Early life 
Daperis was born in Melbourne in 1991, the middle child of three. His father of Greek descent migrated from Egypt and his mother from the United Kingdom. Daniel Daperis is his brother.

Daperis attended Mentone Grammar School in Melbourne for his secondary education before graduating and moving to New York to study at film at New York University; throughout his childhood he performed in films and television.

Daperis returned to his directorial studies in Australia and moved to Sydney to study cinematography at AFTRS. He began his directing career as a commercial director in 2018.

Career
He began acting at an early age appearing in the AFI award-winning short film The Order (1999), directed by Aden Young, and in television series such as Lift Off, Carla Cametti PD, Ocean Starand as Little Joe Cartwright in the US series Ponderosa, the prequel to the hit TV series Bonanza. He also appeared in the Foxtel series Small Time Gangster. However, Daperis is best known for his leading role as the eponymous Squizzy Taylor, in Underbelly: Squizzy.

Feature film work includes the lead role in the Australian feature Playing For Charlie, composed by Academy Award winner Lisa Gerrard (Gladiator (2000) and Whale Rider in 2002 for which he received critical praise and the Italian jockey Frankie Dettori in The Cup (2011), based on the 2002 Melbourne Cup. He lent his voice to the sheep ensemble in the animated Paramount movie Charlotte's Web (2006).

His final acting appearance was in Network Nine's Underbelly: Squizzy series, where he played the lead, Joseph Leslie "Squizzy" Taylor, in 2012.

Appearances

Awards and nominations

ARIA Music Awards
The ARIA Music Awards is an annual awards ceremony that recognises excellence, innovation, and achievement across all genres of Australian music. They commenced in 1987. 

! 
|-
| 2016
| Daniel and Jared Daperis for Gang of Youths' "The Deepest Signs, the Frankest Shadows"
| Best Video
| 
|  
|-

References

External links
 

1991 births
Australian people of Greek descent
Australian male television actors
People educated at Mentone Grammar School
Living people